Ettl is a surname. Notable people with the surname include:

Harald Ettl (born 1947), Austrian politician
Helmut Ettl (born 1965), Austrian economist
Karl Ettl (1899–1956), Austrian operatic bass singer
Katherine Ettl (1911–1993), American sculptor

See also
Ettel